Presidential elections were held in Tanganyika on 1 November 1962. They were the first elections following independence the previous year and the decision to form a republic. Julius Nyerere, leader of the ruling Tanganyika African National Union and incumbent Prime Minister won easily with 98% of the vote. No further multi-party elections were held until 1995.

Results

There were around 1.8 million registered voters.

References

Elections in Tanzania
1962 in Tanganyika
Tanganyika
Election and referendum articles with incomplete results
November 1962 events in Africa